This list of islands of the Luleå archipelago includes the many islands, large and small, in the Swedish Luleå archipelago in the north of the Bothnian Bay.
They are part of the larger archipelago that encompasses islands around the northern end of the bay.

Islands in Luleå Municipality include:

Abborvikgrundet
Äggrundet
Ågrundet
Alskäret
Antnäs-Börstskäret
Avasjögrundet
Bådan
Bastaskäret
Båtö-Fröskan
Båtöharun
Båtöklubben
Båtön, Luleå
Bergön, Luleå
Biskopsgrundet
Biskopsholmen
Bjässhällan
Björkön, Luleå
Björkören
Björkskäret, Kluntarna
Blockören
Bockhällan
Bockön, Luleå
Bockstensrevet
Bodgrundet
Bodören
Borgen, Luleå
Börstskärbådan
Brändavagrundet
Brändöhamnsrevet
Brändön (island)
Brändören
Brändöskär
Brännholmsören
Buketten
Bullran
Degerö-Börstskär
Degerön, Luleå
Enagrundet, Luleå
Eriksgrundet
Estersön
Fågelreven
Fårön, Luleå
Finnskäret
Fjärdsgrundet, Luleå
Fjuksögrundet
Fjuksökallarna
Fjuksön
Flakaskäret
Fliggen
Franska stenarna
Furuholmen, Bockön
Furuholmen, Råne
Furuholmen, Sandön
Germandöhällan
Germandön
Germandösten
Grangrundet
Granholmen, Råne
Granön
Granön-Äggskär
Granskäret, Luleå
Gråsjälgrundet, Luleå
Gråsjälreven
Gräsögrundet
Grillklippan, Båtön
Grillklippan, Rödkallen
Grisselklippan
Grönnan
Gubben
Hällgrundet, Brändöskär
Hällgrundet, Luleå
Hällhamnsgrynnan
Hällhamnsklippan
Hällholmen, Luleå
Hällklimpen
Halsön, Luleå
Hamnögrundet
Hamnön
Hamnöörarna
Hansgrundet
Hästgrunden
Hästgrundreven
Hindersö-Fröskan
Hindersön
Höghällan
Hovlössgrönnan
Husön
Husören, Tistersöarna
Husören, Båtön
Innersthällen / Bredhällen
Inre grundet
Junköklippan
Junkön
Kalixgrundet
Kälkholmen
Kallax Svarten
Kallaxön
Kallen
Kasthällan
Kastören, Luleå
Kåtaholmen
Kåtaholmgrundet
Kilsgrundet
Kindskatarevet
Klasgrönnan
Klemensskäret
Klingergrundet, Luleå
Kluntarna, Luleå
Klyvan
Klyvgrunden
Knivören
Köpmanholmen, Lule Archipel
Kortspelagrundet
Kråkrevet, Småskär
Kråkrevet, Brändöskär
Krångetören
Krokabuskgrundet
Kunoön
Kunoönhällan
Kvarnhällorna
Lågören
Långholmen, Luleå
Långön
Långörgrundet
Långrevet
Laxögrundet
Laxön
Laxövattungen
Lekrevet
Likskäret, Luleå
Lill Båtöklippan
Lill Bullerskäret
Lill Henriksgrundet
Lill Hindersöharun
L, vervolg
Lill Långören
Lill Sikören
Lill Svartgrundet
Lill-Bergögrundet
Lill-Furuholmen
Lill-Furuön
Lill-Hamnskäret
Lill-Hundskäret
Lill-Kilholmen
Lill-Kunoögrund
Lill-Mannöhällan
Lill-Renholmsgrundet
Lill-Risöholmen
Lill-Skränmåsören
Lillbjörnen
Lillhällan
Lillskorvgrundet
Linneagrundet
Lönngrundet, Luleå
Lossen (island)
Lövgrundet, Lule
Lövören
Luleå
Lulhällan
Mannön
Mannöskäret
Mannövattungen
Månshällorna
Megrönnan
Mjoön, Luleå
Mörön (island)
Mössan
Mulön
Musgrundet
Nagelskäret
Nätigrundet, Luleå
Nördskatagrundet
Norr-Äspen
Norr-Tistersön
Norrbrottet
Notvikgrunden
Nygrönnhällan
Nygrönnrevet
Örgrundet
Orrskäret, Hindersön
Östigrundet
Östregrundet
Östreklacken
Oxgrundet
Piltreven
Rafflan
Råne-archipel
Renholmen
Renholmsgrönnan
Risögrundet
Risön, Luleå
Rödbergsgrunden
Rödbergsklippan
Rödkallen
Rönnören, Luleå
Rövaren
Sandgrönnan
Sandgrönnorna
Sandnäshällan
Sandöbådan
Sandögrundet
Sandön, Luleå
Sandskär, Luleå
Sandskärhällan
Sandviksreven
Sigfridsön
Sikhällan
Sikören
Sikörgrunden
Sikörgrundet
Sikrevet
Skagerören
Skärgrundet
Skärgrundsflagan
Skepparskäret
Skinnaren
Skogsskäret
Skorven
Skutgrundet
Sladagrundet
Smålsön
Småskär
Smulterskäret
Sör-Äspen
Sör-Rengrundet
Sör-Tistersön
Sörbrottet
Sörön
Spålgrundet
Stångholmen
Stångholmgrundet
Stor Båtönklippan
Stor Bullerskäret
Stor Hindersöharun
Stor Långören
Stor Svartgrundet
Stor-Bergögrundet
Stor-Furuholmen
Stor-Furuön
Stor-Hamnskäret
Stor-Hundskäret
Stor-Kallgröten
Stor-Kilholmen
Stor-Kunoögrund
Stor-Lönngrundet
Stor-Mannöhällan
Stor-Renholmsgrundet
Stor-Risöholmen
Stor-Skränmåsören
Storbrändön
Storgrönnan
Storgrundet, Degerö
Storgrundet, Hindersön
Storgrundet, Rödkallen
Storgrundet, Tistersöarna
Storhällan
Storrevet, Luleå
Storsandrevet
Storstengrundet, Luleå
Strapögrönnan
Strapön
Strömmingsören
Strömören
Styrmärkesgrundet
Svartgrundet, Luleå
Svartön, Luleå
Svartören
Svartörsrevet
Tärngrundet
Tjuvholmen
Tomgrundet
Troppen, Luleå
Troppen, Råneå
Trutören, Hindersön
Trutören, Sandön
Trutörgrönnan
Tvegränaören
Utlöktesgrundet
Vallören
Västangrunden
Västifjärdgrundet
Vättarna
Vattungen, Luleå
Vitfågelskäret
Ytterstgrundet
Yttersthällan
Ytterstholmen, Luleå
Yttre Sandgrundet, Luleå
Yxören

See also
List of islands of Bothnian Bay

References

Lulea
Lulea
Lulea